George Joseph Michael (born January 30, 1961) is an American historian, political scientist, and writer. He is a professor at the criminal justice faculty of Westfield State University in Massachusetts, and previously served as associate professor of nuclear counterproliferation and deterrence theory at the Air War College and as associate professor of political science and administration of justice at The University of Virginia's College at Wise. He studies right-wing extremism, including the relationship between militant Islam and the far right, and is the author of Confronting Right-Wing Extremism and Terrorism in the USA (2003), The Enemy of My Enemy: The Alarming Convergence of Militant Islam and the Extreme Right (2006), Willis Carto and the American Far Right (2008), Theology of Hate: A History of the World Church of the Creator (2009), Lone Wolf Terror and the Rise of Leaderless Resistance (2012), and Extremism in America (editor) (2014). Professor Michael has also published research on SETI (Search for Extraterrestrial Intelligence) and is the author of Preparing for Contact: When Humans and Extraterrestrials Finally Meet (2014).

Early life and education
Michael was born in 1961 and has a B.S. from Widener University and an M.A. from Temple University. He obtained his Ph.D. in public policy from George Mason University in 2002, where he studied under Francis Fukuyama, with a thesis entitled "The U.S. Response to Domestic Right Wing Terrorism and Extremism: A Government and NGO Partnership."

Career
Described by The Christian Science Monitor as an expert on political extremism, he was awarded the University of Virginia's "Outstanding Research Award", awarded to a faculty member who "has contributed significantly to published research in his or her discipline".

Michael is a veteran of the U.S. Air Force and the Pennsylvania Air National Guard. As a civilian, he conducted operations research for the U.S. Army.

In 2003, he authored Confronting Right-wing Extremism and Terrorism in the USA, which discussed domestic terrorists and the threats which they pose to the U.S. "homeland security."

Political Science Quarterly reviewed his 2006 book The Enemy of My Enemy, writing that it "explores the connections and possibilities for cooperation between militant Islamic movements and Western right-wing extremism", and it "provides a good overview of the historical and intellectual wellsprings of these two movements, but it ultimately does not provide a case that would justify alarm". Daveed Gartenstein-Ross of The Weekly Standard also reviewed it. He found it too long, yet lacking in analysis. But he noted its "in-depth study of the on-again, off-again love affair between radical Islam and the extreme right."  

His 2008 book Willis Carto and the American Far Right is about Willis Carto, founder of the Liberty Lobby.

Michael says that post-9/11, underground radio stations that traffic in conspiracy theories and incite violence in the U.S. are under greater scrutiny because law enforcement has been given more power to prosecute such speech. He also says that the American Free Press newspaper is "the most important newspaper of the radical right." He notes that:  "Traditionally, critique of the IRS has come from the right, such as the Christian Patriot movement, but sovereign citizen movements also invoke a lot of left-wing ideas like anti-capitalism that are consistent with the times and the downturn in the economy, where people may have property liens against them."

Bibliography

Books
Confronting Right Wing Extremism and Terrorism in the USA (Routledge, 2003).
Theology of Hate: A History of the World Church of the Creator (University Press of Florida, 2009).
The Enemy of my Enemy: The Alarming Convergence of Militant Islam and the Extreme Right (University Press of Kansas, 2006).
Willis Carto and the American far right, George Michael, University Press of Florida, 2008, 
Theology of Hate: A History of the World Church of the Creator, George Michael,  (2009)
Lone Wolf Terror and the Rise of Leaderless Resistance, George Michael, Vanderbilt University Press, 2012, 
Extremism in America, George Michael (editor), University Press of Florida, 2014, 
Preparing for Contact: When Humans and Extraterrestrials Finally Meet, George Michael, RVP Press, 2014, 

Articles

References

External links

"The strategic perils of suicide terrorism" by George Michael, Star-Telegram, October 16, 2005.

Weisenburger, Steven. "Confronting Right-Wing Extremism and Terrorism in the USA (Book Review), The Journal of Southern History, February 1, 2005, accessed April 19, 2010.

1961 births
Academics and writers on far-right extremism
American political scientists
American political writers
American male non-fiction writers
American anti-fascists
Historians of fascism
George Mason University alumni
Critics of Islamism
Living people
Pennsylvania Air National Guard
Temple University alumni
University of Virginia's College at Wise people
University of Virginia faculty
Widener University alumni